The 2010 Rundili Wuxi Classic was a professional non-ranking snooker tournament held between 3–6 June 2010 at the Wuxi Sports Center in Wuxi, China. The event was known as Jiangsu Classic in 2009.

Mark Allen was the defending champion, but he lost 1–6 in the semi-finals against Shaun Murphy. Murphy then won in the final 9–8 against Ding Junhui, winning the last seven frames from 2–8 down.


Main draw

Final

Century breaks
 134, 131  Marco Fu
 129  Mark Selby
 125, 113, 101, 100  Shaun Murphy
 108  Ding Junhui

References

2010
Wuxi Classic
Wuxi Classic